Ballyheigue GAA is a hurling and gaelic football club in north County Kerry, Ireland. The club competes at all levels of hurling at county and North Kerry and also plays some underage football as well as competing in the county junior football league and the county novice football shield.

History

The club was founded in 1892. The field, which is named after John Joe O'Sullivan, was purchased in the 1950s. Club rooms were later built in 1974. A new ball alley, dressing rooms and a meeting room were opened in 2006. Willie Leen is president of the club and a trustee of the club grounds since the grounds were first acquired; He put his farm up as collateral in the Bank in order to secure a loan to buy the field. The club dressing rooms are named after the late Paddy Casey who was club chairman at the time of construction. Ballyheigue GAA have won the County Senior County Championship five times: in 1946, 1992, 1996, 1997, 2000.

Championships won

Hurling
 Kerry Senior Hurling Championship 5: 1946, 1992, 1996, 1997, 2000
 Kerry Intermediate Hurling Championship Winner (1): 1975
 Kerry Junior Hurling Championship Winner (3): 2018, 2019, 2020
 Kerry Under-21 hurling championship Winner (6): 1980, 1991, 1994, 1995, 1996, 1997 
 Kerry Minor Hurling Championship Winner (3): 1960, 1982, 1992 
 County Senior Hurling League (Div.1) 3: 1996, 2002, 2005, 2011
 County Minor Hurling League (Div 1) Winner (1): 1991
 North Kerry Senior Hurling Championship Winner (5): 1946, 1995, 1996, 1999, 2007
 North Kerry Intermediate Hurling Championship 2: 1969, 1975
 North Kerry Junior Hurling Championship Winner (1): 1926
 North Kerry Under-21 Hurling Championship 5: 1979, 1980, 1984, 1994, 1995
 North Kerry Minor Championship 3: 1991, 1994, 1996
 North Kerry Senior Hurling League Winners (5): 1991, 1996, 2000, 2002, 2007
 North Kerry Intermediate Hurling League Winner (1): 2007

Football
 Kerry Novice Football Championship Winner (1): 1991
Junior County Football League (Div. 4) Winner (1): 2003

Notable players

Michael ‘Boxer’ Slattery
John Healy
Brendan O'Sullivan
Steve Hennessy
Dougal 'The Bull' Donovan

References

External links
Official Ballyheigue GAA website

Gaelic games clubs in County Kerry
Gaelic football clubs in County Kerry
Hurling clubs in County Kerry